Poatina (derived from an indigenous word for "cave") is a town in Tasmania, Australia 60 km south of Launceston. The Western Tiers mountain range surrounds Poatina. 

Poatina Village was constructed in the 1960s to house the work force of the Poatina Power Station, which was commissioned in 1964. Hydro Tasmania sold the village in 1995 to Fusion Australia, an Australian Christian not-for-profit youth and community organisation. In 2010, Poatina was described as "a tightly knit Christian community".

As of 2014, the Poatina Chalet was part of a resort area owned by Fusion Australia. At that time, Poatina was home to a Golden Chain Motel, Mountain View Restaurant, a metal fabrication workshop, a hot glass studio, a golf course, a private school, and an artists' community. As of 2020, Poatina had "streets...lined with 1950s houses," "a general store, a petrol pump and even a phone box".

The 2016 census reported that Poatina had a population of 96.

References

Midlands (Tasmania)